Kornprom Jaroonpong   (born December 12, 1988), simply known as Poon. He is a professional footballer from Surat Thani, Thailand. He currently plays for Samut Sakhon in the Thai League 2.

Club career

Honours

Ubon UMT United

Regional League Division 2
 Winner  : 2015
Regional League North-East Division
 Runner-up  : 2015

References

External links
Kornprom Jaroonpong at soccerway.com

1988 births
Living people
Kornprom Jaroonpong
Kornprom Jaroonpong
Association football central defenders
Kornprom Jaroonpong
Kornprom Jaroonpong
Kornprom Jaroonpong
Kornprom Jaroonpong
Kornprom Jaroonpong
Kornprom Jaroonpong
Singapore Premier League players